Ilya Kukharchik (born 10 March 1997) is a Belarusian professional footballer who plays for Belshina Bobruisk.

References

External links 
 
 

1997 births
Living people
Belarusian footballers
People from Baranavichy
Sportspeople from Brest Region
Belarus youth international footballers
Association football midfielders
FC BATE Borisov players
FC Baranovichi players
FC Vitebsk players
FC Belshina Bobruisk players
FC Torpedo-BelAZ Zhodino players